Umbonium eloiseae is a species of sea snail, a marine gastropod mollusk in the family Trochidae, the top snails.

Description
The size of the shell varies between 7 mm and 20 mm.

Distribution
This marine species occurs in the Gulf of Oman.

References

External links
 To World Register of Marine Species
 

eloiseae
Gastropods described in 1992